Extremely Severe Cyclonic Storm Sidr was a tropical cyclone that resulted in one of the worst natural disasters in Bangladesh. The storm eventually made landfall in Bangladesh on November 15, 2007, causing large-scale evacuations. At least 3,447 deaths have been blamed on the storm, with some estimates reaching 15,000.

Save the Children estimated the number of deaths associated with the cyclone to be between 3,100 and 10,000, while the Red Crescent Society reported on November 18 that the number of deaths could be up to 15,000. Other aid agencies have estimated a death toll of up to 15,000. International groups pledged US$95 million to repair the damage, which was estimated at 196.25 billion taka (US$2.31 billion).

Meteorological history

On November 9, an area of disturbed weather developed southeast of the Andaman Islands, with a weak low-level circulation near the Nicobar Islands. Initially moderate upper-level wind shear inhibited organization, while strong diffluence aloft aided in developing convection. Vertical shear decreased greatly as the circulation became better defined, and a Tropical Cyclone Formation Alert was issued on November 11 while located a short distance south of the Andaman Islands. Around the same time, the India Meteorological Department (IMD) designated the system as Depression BOB 09. Later that day, it intensified into a deep depression as it moved slowly north-westward.

The IMD upgraded the system to Cyclonic Storm Sidr early on November 12. The system then began to intensify quickly as it moved slowly northwestward, and the IMD upgraded it to a severe cyclonic storm later that day and a very severe cyclonic storm early the next day. On the morning of November 15, the cyclone intensified to reach peak winds of  according to the IMD, and a peak of  according to the JTWC best track. It weakened rapidly after landfall and the final advisories were issued early on November 16.

Preparations

As it intensified to a Category 4-equivalent cyclone on November 15, thousands of emergency officials were put on standby in eastern India and Bangladesh in advance of the storm's arrival. Forecast heights of the storm surge predicted by a numerical model developed by Dr. Hassan Mashriqui (Louisiana State University) was communicated to the emergency response authorities in Bangladesh, prompting a massive evacuations of low-lying coastal areas. A total of 2 million people in Bangladesh evacuated to emergency shelters. The Indian Metrological Department (IMD) also issued a cyclone alert for Odisha and West Bengal on November 14. In Bangladesh, an emergency cabinet meeting decided to withdraw weekly leave for the government officials to join the evacuation process. Over 40,000 Red Crescent volunteers were deployed to order residents in the 15 affected provinces into special cyclone and flood shelters. The main ports had been closed.

Impact

Coastal districts of Bangladesh faced heavy rainfall as an early impact of the cyclone. Dhaka and other parts of Bangladesh experienced drizzle and gusty winds. Total losses reached 196.25 billion taka (US$2.31 billion).

The damage in Bangladesh was extensive, including tin shacks flattened, houses and schools blown away and enormous tree damage. Some local officials have described the damage as being even worse than that from the 1991 cyclone. The entire cities of Patuakhali, Barguna and Jhalokati District were hit hard by the storm surge of over 5 meters (16 ft). About a quarter of the world heritage site Sunderbans were damaged. Researchers said mangrove forest Sunderban will take at least 40 years to recover itself from this catastrophe.
Much of the capital city of Dhaka was also severely affected, as electricity and water service were cut and significant damage was reported there due to winds and flooding. The local agricultural industry was also devastated, as many rice crops — which have a December harvest — were lost.

At least 3,447 deaths have been reported. The hardest-hit area was Barguna, where 423 people were reported to have been killed, according to local officials. Patuakhali was also hard-hit, with 385 deaths reported. Most of the deaths confirmed thus far were due to the winds, although 13 of them have been as a result of capsized boats in the Faridpur district of Bangladesh. The head of the Red Crescent in Bangladesh expected the death toll to reach as high as 15,000. Over 3,000 other fishermen were reported missing on over 500 fishing boats. The maximum estimated death toll from Sidr in the densely populated region is over 15,000.

Disaster response

Sidr may be the strongest cyclone to hit the country since a cyclone killed over 143,000 Bangladeshis in 1991.
Although, the death from Sidr number in the thousands but damage to homes, crops and livelihoods could be extensive and were reportedly worst. Effective early warning, cyclone shelters and disaster relief measure implementations helped reduce the death toll. Under a Cyclone Preparedness Program, volunteers evacuated at least 600,000 Bangladeshis in the path of the storm. Many are housed in 1,800 multipurpose disaster shelters built along the coast. Relief organizations distributed seven-day emergency disaster kits of food, blankets and clothing for evacuated families.

Since 1991, the donor community, including the US and EC, has supported disaster-preparedness to mitigate the impact of tropical storms and improve post-disaster relief and reconstruction. Cyclone walls planted within trees are in place to protect vulnerable areas from storm surges. Disaster shelters on stilts housing refugees plus early warning systems and timely evacuations appear to have greatly reduced the fatalities from Sidr. It killed around 15,000 people, the highest number since a cyclone killed nearly 140,000 in the region in 1991.

With wind velocities of up to 260 km/h, Cyclone Sidr has been named one of the 10 strongest and deadliest cyclones to strike the region of Bangladesh between 1876 and 2010.

Aftermath

National response
After the storm, 18 Bangladesh Air Force helicopters and five Bangladesh Navy ships were immediately dispatched with food, medicine, and relief supplies for the hardest-hit areas. Bangladesh Red Crescent Society initially asked 400 million Taka (US$5,807,594) to the international community. As part of the Bangladeshi cricket team's tour in New Zealand, a charity Twenty20 match was held with all funds raised going to the victims. In addition, the International Cricket Council donated US$250,000 to the funds at the start of the match. The Ministry of Food and Disaster Management allocated 4,000 metric tonnes of rice, 7,500 tents, 18,000 blankets, and 30 million Taka (US$435,569) in relief grants. About 13,000 housing packages, consisting of iron sheets for roofing and family kits were prepared for immediate distribution. A special 350 million Taka (US$5,081,645) fund for housing was established by November 22, 2007. At that time, 732 medical teams were deployed to the affected areas.

International response

International communities had expanded their hands towards Bangladesh on this disaster. Below is a contribution list.

 ReliefAid

Post-storm diseases
People of the cyclone affected area experienced severe health problems such as diseases like diarrhea, which spread due to shortage of drinking water. The landfall of Sidr had followed the devastation caused by consecutive floods earlier in 2007. By January 15, 2008, the World Health Organization (WHO) reported that 44 people had Jaundice, 3,572 had Diarrhoea, 3,210 had Pneumonia, 7,538 were suffering from a skin disease, 2,309 had eye infections, and 10,349 had Typhoid Fever. To help reduce further spreading of the diseases, the Government of Norway provided the WHO with four water treatment plants to be used in areas affected by Sidr.

Notes

See also
 List of Bangladesh tropical cyclones
 List of tropical cyclone records
 List of North Indian cyclone seasons
 Geography of Bangladesh
 Timeline of the 2007 North Indian Ocean cyclone season
 1970 Bhola cyclone – The deadliest cyclone ever recorded, following a similar path, also making landfall in November.
 Cyclone Gonu
 Cyclone Amphan

References

External links

 History of past cyclones in the Bay of Bengal (IMD)
 BBC article on Cyclone Sidr
 Automated Advanced Dvorak Technique estimate from UW-CIMSS
Crisis profile Cyclone Sidr  From Reuters Alertnet 

2007 North Indian Ocean cyclone season
Tropical cyclones in Bangladesh
2007 in Bangladesh
Extremely severe cyclonic storms
Tropical cyclones in 2007